By-elections to for the French National Assembly are held within three months after the invalidation of the election or resignation of a deputy. No by-elections are held within the twelve months of the end of a parliamentary cycle. Eight by-elections have been called since the inauguration of the 15th legislature of the French Fifth Republic.

List

Cumulative results 
The changes displayed within the table below compare the results of by-elections up to the end of September 2018 to the outcome of the 2017 legislative elections within the constituencies where by-elections had been held till then. The classification of candidates and changes are based on the classification of candidates at the time. For example, in the 2018 by-election for French Guiana's 2nd constituency, Davy Rimane was classified as a regionalist candidate in 2017 and a candidate of La France Insoumise in 2018 (and a comparison therefore made with 2017 candidate Paul Persdam); in addition, Ramlati Ali was classified as a Socialist Party candidate in 2017 and miscellaneous left in 2018.

2018 by-elections

Val-d'Oise's 1st constituency

Territoire de Belfort's 1st constituency

French Guiana's 2nd constituency

Haute-Garonne's 8th constituency

Loiret's 4th constituency

Mayotte's 1st constituency

French residents overseas' 5th constituency

Wallis and Futuna's 1st constituency

Réunion's 7th constituency

Essonne's 1st constituency

2020

Seine-Maritime's 5th constituency 

 
 
 
 
 
 
 
 
|-
| colspan="8" bgcolor="#E9E9E9"|
|-

Val-de-Marne's 9th constituency

2021

Pas-de-Calais's 6th constituency 
Pas-de-Calais's 6th constituency is vacant since 27 September 2020.

Paris's 15th constituency 
MP for Paris's 15th constituency George Pau-Langevin resigned.

Indre-et-Loire's 3rd constituency 

 Indre-et-Loire's 3rd constituency

Oise's 1st constituency 
Olivier Dassault died suddenly in March 2021. He was succeeded by his nephew Victor Habert-Dassault.

Indre-et-Loire's 3rd constituency 
Sophie Métadier was elected in Indre-et-Loire's 3rd constituency

See also 
List of by-elections to the National Assembly (France)

References

External links 
Results of past legislative by-elections from the Ministry of the Interior 

2018 elections in France
 
January 2018 events in France
February 2018 events in France
March 2018 events in France